The Mosque of Zubayr ibn al-Awwam is a mosque, mausoleum and shrine located at Az-Zubayr in Basra, Iraq. The mosque is believed to contain the tombs of Zubayr ibn al-Awwam and Utbah ibn Ghazwan.

References

Buildings and structures in Basra